Sprouty-related, EVH1 domain-containing protein 2 is a protein that in humans is encoded by the SPRED2 gene.

Function 

SPRED2 is a member of the Sprouty (see SPRY1)/SPRED family of proteins that regulate growth factor-induced activation of the MAP kinase cascade (see MAPK1).

References

Further reading

External links
  GeneReviews/NIH/NCBI/UW entry on Legius syndrome SPRED1 Sprouty-related, EVH1 domain-containing protein 1

SPR domain
EVH1 domain
Human proteins